Efail Isaf railway station was a former railway station in Efail Isaf in south Wales. It was on the Barry Railway between Tonteg and Wenvoe, which ran broadly north–south through Creigiau.

History

The line and station closed to passengers on 10 September 1962.

The layout was of four lines, two through lines and two platforms on the outer lines only; a short siding existed additionally. The platforms remain and a public footpath now runs between them, the platforms mainly intact and the foundations of the buildings still evident with original floor tiles showing in places.

References

External links
Efail Isaf Station on navigable 1947 O.S. map
Efail Isaf Station layout

Disused railway stations in Cardiff
Railway stations in Great Britain opened in 1896
Railway stations in Great Britain closed in 1962
Former Barry Railway stations
1896 establishments in Wales
1962 disestablishments in Wales